Curtis or Curtiss is a common English given name and surname of Anglo-Norman origin from the Old French curteis (Modern French courtois) which derived from the Spanish Cortés (of which Cortez is a variation) and the Portuguese and Galician Cardoso.

The name means "polite, courteous, or well-bred". It is a compound of curt- "court" and -eis "-ish". The spelling u to render [u] in Old French was mainly Anglo-Norman and Norman, when the spelling o [u] was the usual Parisian French one, Modern French ou [u]. -eis is the Old French suffix for -ois, Western French (including Anglo-Norman) keeps -eis, simplified to -is in English. The word court shares the same etymology but retains a Modern French spelling, after the orthography had changed.

It was brought to England (and subsequently, the rest of the Isles) via the Norman Conquest. In the United Kingdom, the name Curtis was at its height in 1996, when it was the 78th most popular boy's name in England and Wales. Curtis was the 72nd most popular boy's name in 1963 in the United States, but has declined in popularity there since. Many Hungarian immigrants in English-speaking countries with the last name Kertész have adopted the name Curtis, since it is pronounced similarly and helped them integrate into their new community.

Surname

People 
Adam Curtis (born 1955), English television documentarian
Alan Curtis (disambiguation), multiple people
Alice B. Curtis (1874–1956), American suffragist, writer
Alice Turner Curtis (1860–1958), American writer
Alison Curtis (born 1977), Canadian-Irish radio presenter
Allen Curtis (1877–1961), American film director
Andrew Curtis (cricketer) (born 1943), English cricketer
Anne Curtis (born 1985), Philippine actress
Anthony Curtiss (1919–1981), American naturalist, elder brother of Sydney Curtiss and Thomas Quinn Curtiss
Aubyn Curtiss (1925–2017), American politician
Benjamin Curtis (disambiguation), also Ben Curtis, multiple people
Cathrine Curtis (1889- ?), American actress
Catie Curtis (born 1965), American singer-songwriter
Chad Curtis (born 1968), American former major league baseball player convicted of sexual assault
Charles Curtis (botanist) (1853–1928), English botanist who became the first superintendent of the Penang Botanic Gardens
Charles Curtis (disambiguation), several people
Charles Curtis (1860–1936), 31st vice president of the United States (1929–1933)
Charles Curtiss (1908–1993), American communist
Charles W. Curtis (born 1926), American mathematician
Chet Curtis (1939–2014), American journalist
Chris Curtis (1941–2005), English musician, member of The Searchers
Chuck Curtis (1935–2016), American football coach
Cliff Curtis (baseball) (1881–1943), American baseball player
Cliff Curtis (born 1968), New Zealand film and television actor
Cyrus H. K. Curtis (1850–1933), American magazine publisher
David Curtis (disambiguation), multiple people
Dexter Curtis (1828–1898), American inventor and politician
Dick Curtis (1902–1952), American actor
Edmund Curtis (1881–1943), historian and Professor of History
Edward S. Curtis (1868–1952), photographer
Edwin Curtis (1906–1999), English Anglican archbishop in Mauritius
Elden Francis Curtiss (born 1932), American prelate of the Roman Catholic Church
Emma Curtiss Bascom (1828–1916), American educator, suffragist and reformer
George M. Curtis (New York politician) (1840–1915), American lawyer, politician and judge
George Ticknor Curtis (1812–1894), American politician and lawyer
George William Curtis (1824–1892), American writer and public speaker
Glenn Curtiss (1878–1930), American aviation pioneer
Glenn Curtiss (1878–1930), American aviation pioneer and founder of the Curtiss Aeroplane and Motor Company
H. W. Curtiss (1824–1902), American politician
Harriot Curtis (1881–1974), American golfer
Harry Curtis (baseball) (1883–1951), American baseball player
Heber Doust Curtis (1872–1942), American astronomer
Ian Curtis (1956–1980), English musician, lead singer of Joy Division
James Curtiss (1803–1859), American politician
Jamie Lee Curtis (born 1958), American actress
Jasmine Curtis (born 1994), Filipino actress
Jim Curtiss (1861–1945), American professional baseball player
John Curtis (disambiguation), several people
John Curtiss Underwood (1809–1873), American lawyer, abolitionist politician, and federal judge
John Curtiss (Royal Air Force officer) (1924–2013), British Royal Air Force officer
John Shelton Curtiss (1899–1983), American historian of Russia and historical scholar of old Yankee stock
Joseph S. Curtis (1831–1878), American politician and lawyer
Julian Wheeler Curtiss (1858–1944), golf equipment manufacturer
Kathlyn Curtis, Manitoba judge
Kelly Curtis (born 1956), American actress
Kevin Curtis (born 1978), American football player
King Curtis (1934–1971), American saxophonist
L. Perry Curtis (born 1932), American historian of Ireland
Larry Curtiss, American chemist
Lee Curtis (born Peter Flannery), British musician
Leon Curtiss (1861–1934), American politician
Lionel George Curtis (1872–1955), founder of the Royal Institute of International Affairs
Louis Curtiss (1865–1924), Canadian-born American architect
Louisa Knapp Curtis (1851–1910), columnist and first editor of The Ladies Home Journal
Mac Curtis (1939–2013), American musician
Margaret Curtis (1883–1965), American golfer and tennis player
Mark Curtis (British author), British political author
Mark Curtis (SWP member) (born 1959), former American Socialist Worker's Party member
Martha E. Sewall Curtis (1858–1915), American suffragist, writer
Mary C. Curtis (born 1953), American journalist
Mary Louise Curtis Bok Zimbalist (1876–1970), founder of the Curtis Institute of Music, Philadelphia
Matt Curtis, American college baseball coach
McClendon Curtis (born 1999), American football player
Michael Curtis (disambiguation), several people
Moses Ashley Curtis (M.A. Curtis, 1808–1872), American botanist and mycologist
Nannie Webb Curtis (1861-1920), American lecturer, temperance activist, clubwoman
Norman Curtis (footballer) (1924–2009), English football player
Patrick Curtis (bishop) (1740–1832), Irish archbishop
Patrick Curtis (producer) (born 1938), American producer
Philip Curtis (1926–1951), English soldier
Philip Curtiss (1885–1964), politician, novelist, and newspaper reporter
Ralph Hamilton Curtiss (1880–1929), American astronomer
Reginald Salmond Curtis (1863–1922), British soldier
Richard Curtis (born 1956), British comedy scriptwriter
Ronan Curtis (born 1996), Irish football player
Roy Curtiss, American microbiologist
Samuel Curtis (S.Curtis, 1779–1860), English botanist
Samuel Ryan Curtis (1805–1866), Union General in the American Civil War
Sarah Curtis (geographer), British geographer and academic
Scott Curtis (American football) (born 1964), American football player
Scott Curtis (born 1984), American actor and musician
Sidney Curtiss (1917–1994), American politician
Thomas Bradford Curtis (1911–1993), American Representative from Missouri
Thomas Quinn Curtiss (1915–2000), French-born writer, and film and theatre critic
Tom Curtis (disambiguation), several people
Tommy Curtis (1952–2021), American college basketball player
Tony Curtis (1925–2010), American actor
Ulysses Curtis (1926–2013), American football player
Virginia Henry Curtiss Heckscher (1875–1941), president of The Heckscher Foundation for Children
Walker M. Curtiss (1852–1917), American politician
Wayne Curtis (footballer, born 1967), Welsh football player
Willa Pearl Curtis (1896–1970), American actress
William Curtis (1746–1799), English botanist
Zelda Curtis (1923–2012), English author and journalist

Fictional characters 
Randall Curtis, character on The Simpsons based on George Lucas
Rey Curtis, character on Law & Order
Izumi Curtis, character in Fullmetal Alchemist
 Three brothers on The Outsiders, Ponyboy Curtis (the novel's narrator), Sodapop Curtis and Darrel "Darry" Curtis
 Jackson Curtis and Kate Curtis, fictional characters from 2012 (film)
Curtis Hagen, character on White Collar

Given name

People 
Curtis Armstrong (born 1953), American actor
Curtis Bolton (born 1995), American football player
Curtis Brooks (born 1998), American football player
Curtis Browning (born 1993), Australian Rugby Union player
Curtis Bush (born 1962), American kickboxer
Curtis Cheng, Hong Kong-Australian unsworn police employee shot dead by an Arab extremist
Curtis Cregan (born 1977), American singer and actor
Curtis Enis (born 1976), NFL running back
Curtis Granderson (born 1981), New York Mets outfielder
Curtis Hanson (born 1945), American filmmaker
Curtis Hodges (born 1999), American football player
Curtis Jackson III (born 1975), American rapper, actor and entrepreneur (better known as 50 Cent)
Curtis Jerrells (born 1987), basketball player for Hapoel Jerusalem of the Israeli Premier League
Curtis Joseph (born 1967), Canadian ice hockey goaltender
Curtis Lazar, ice hockey player
Curtis Lee (1939–2015), American singer 
Curtis LeMay (1906–1990), American general in the United States Air Force
Curtis Martin (born 1973), American football player
Curtis Mayfield (1942–1999), American singer-songwriter
Curtis Naughton (born 1995), English Rugby League player
Curtis Painter (born 1985), American football quarterback
Curtis Reitz (born ), Algernon Sydney Biddle Professor of Law at the University of Pennsylvania Law School
Curtis Robb (born 1972), British middle-distance runner
Curtis Robinson (born 1998), American football player
Curtis Rowe (born 1949), American basketball player
Curtis Salgado (born 1954), rhythm and blues musician and singer-songwriter
Curtis Samuel (born 1996), American football player
Curtis Sironen (born 1993), Australian Rugby League player
Curtis Stigers (born 1965), American singer-songwriter
Curtis Stone (born 1975), Australian TV chef
Curtis Strange (born 1955), American professional golfer
Curtis Warren (born 1963), British criminal
Curtis Weaver (born 1998), American football player
Curtis Woodhouse (born 1980), English football player and boxer
Curtis Yarvin (born 1973), American writer

Fictional characters 
Curtis Holt (Arrowverse), fictional character in Arrow on CW as Mister Terrific played by Actor Echo Kellum
Curtis Donovan, fictional character played by actor Nathan Stewart-Jarrett as part of the UK television series Misfits
Curtis Manning, fictional character played by Jamaican-Canadian actor Roger Cross as part of the television series 24
Curtis Wilkins, fictional character from the comic strip Curtis
Curtis (Stargate), recurring character in Stargate Universe

Middle name

People
George Curtis Smith (1935–2020), United States District Court judge
Marron Curtis Fort (1938–2019), American-German translator and educator

Fictional characters
 Amy Curtis March, one of the main characters of the novel Little Women by Louisa May Alcott

See also 
Courtois (disambiguation)
Curtice

References 

English masculine given names
English-language surnames